In Thrall is the debut solo studio album by American musician Murray Attaway, released in 1993.

Track listing
"No Tears Tonight" – 3:56
"Under Jets" – 3:54
"Allegory" – 5:46
"Angels in the Trees" – 4:15
"Living in Another Time" – 3:17
"The Evensong" – 4:07
"Fall So Far" – 4:03
"August Rain" – 6:00
"Walpurgis Night" – 4:09
"My Book" – 4:48
"Home" – 3:43

Personnel
Musicians
Murray Attaway – vocals, guitar
Alex Acuña – percussion
Tony Berg – casio, guitar, percussion, tamboura
Robbie Blunt – guitar
Jon Brion – bass, guitar, mellotron, piano, vibraphone
Jackson Browne – background vocals
David Coleman – electric viola
Gary Ferguson – drums
Nicky Hopkins – organ, piano
Jim Keltner – drums
Aimee Mann – background vocals
David Mansfield – mandocello, mandolin, violin
Pat Mastelotto – drums, percussion
Steve Nieve – wurlitzer
Sid Page – violin
Eric Pressly – bass
Steven Soles – background vocals
Benmont Tench – organ
Patrick Warren – chamberlain, keyboards

Technicians
Martin Brumbach – mixing
Paul Dieter – assistant engineer
Greg Goldman – engineer
James Guthrie – mixing
Chris Lord-Alge – engineer
Bob Ludwig – mastering
Casey McMackin – engineer
Brian Scheuble – engineer
Joel Stoner – engineer
Robert Fisher – art direction, design
Amy Guip – photography
Dennis Keeley – photography

References

1993 debut albums
Geffen Records albums
Murray Attaway albums
Albums produced by Tony Berg